Sakhira is a village in the Punjab province of India and Pakistan.
Most of people in this village have surnames "Pannu" and this village has a sacred Gurudwara-Baba Mai Das ji Gurudwara. It is located at 31°8'0N 72°47'0E with an altitude of 166 metres (547 feet).

References

Villages in Punjab, Pakistan